The Priest from Kirchfeld (German: Der Pfarrer von Kirchfeld) is a 1937 Austrian film directed by Jacob Fleck and Luise Fleck and starring Hans Jaray, Hansi Stork and Ludwig Stössel. It is based on the play Der Pfarrer von Kirchfeld by Ludwig Anzengruber.

Cast
 Hans Jaray as Peter Hell - der Pfarrer von Kirchfeld  
 Hansi Stork as Annerl Birkmeyer  
 Ludwig Stössel as Vetter, der Pfarrer von Skt. Jakob  
 Karl Paryla as Der Wurzelsepp  
 Frida Richard as Josepha, Wurzelsepps Mutter  
 Fred Hülgerth as Michel Berndorfer  
 Rudolf Steinboeck as Loisl  
 Fritz Diestl as Wirt 
 Hanns Kurth as Graf Paul von Finsterberg 
 Poldi Czernitz-Renn as Brigitte, Hells Wirtschafterin  
 Wiener Sängerknaben as Knabenchor  
 Rita Wottowa as Sängerin

References

Bibliography 
 Goble, Alan. The Complete Index to Literary Sources in Film. Walter de Gruyter, 1999.

External links 
 

1937 films
1937 drama films
Austrian drama films
1930s German-language films
Films directed by Luise Fleck
Films directed by Jacob Fleck
Austrian films based on plays
Films based on works by Ludwig Anzengruber
Remakes of Austrian films
Sound film remakes of silent films
Films about Catholic priests
Films set in the Alps
Austrian black-and-white films